is a railway station in Kyōtanabe, Kyoto, Japan. There is a transfer at this station to the nearby Miyamaki Station on the Kintetsu Kyoto Line.

Lines
West Japan Railway Company (JR West)
Katamachi Line (Gakkentoshi Line)

Stations next to JR Miyamaki

History 
Station numbering was introduced in March 2018 with JR Miyamaki being assigned station number JR-H22.

References

External links

Official Website

Railway stations in Kyoto Prefecture
Railway stations in Japan opened in 1952